Deal Casino was an American alternative rock band formed in Sparta, New Jersey in 2013. The band consists of members Joe Parella (lead vocals, guitar), Jozii Cowell (guitar), Jon Rodney (bass), and Christopher Donofrio (drums).

History 
The members of Deal Casino originally started playing together in elementary school, eventually forming a band called Something About January. After a lineup change and some massive changes in their writing process and their approach to music, the band renamed itself after the well-known Jersey beach club, The Deal Casino Bathing Pavilion, after an episode in which they waited for hours there in preparation for the 2013 Bamboozle Music Festival. The Deal Casino gets its name from an infamous shore town whose residents include people like movie theater magnate Walter Reade and Genovese crime family underboss Willie Moretti. Deal Casino has averaged a show a week since their formation in 2013.

Joe Parella, the band's front man, provides lead vocals and plays guitar. The rest of the band consists of Jozii Cowell (guitar), Jon Rodney (guitar), Christopher Donofrio (drums). All are from Sparta, NJ, and were barely 20 years old when they formed the band. All decided to move to live and work in the heart of the Asbury Park music scene. Joe Parella works at the recording studio where they practice and the others work in restaurants/florists. Deal Casino played The Saint for 12 weeks in the Summer of 2014 during their initiation to the Asbury Park, New Jersey music scene. The shows were recorded, and the band reported watching them the next day, taking notes, analyzing them, and planning their improvement like a sports team.  By December 2014, Deal Casino dominated the Asbury Park Music Awards, drawing comparisons with early Smashing Pumpkins and winning more awards than any other group, including Best Pop/Rock Band, Best Vocalist, and Best Live Performance.

The band's sound has been described as "urgent, groove-heavy" and a "boisterous, bouncing rock sound not so far from Neon Trees or Young the Giant," though some object to this characterization. Parella's style has been described as similar to Trees vocalist Tyler Glenn. They have kept the sound very raw to achieve a live, stark, but polished sound. Their early sound was characterized by contrasts between subdued, mellow, and loud, anthem-like sounds. Their lyrics have been described as raw, confessional, and picturesque, similar to those of Arcade Fire and Klaxons. Deal Casino has been described as "an explosive live act, ramping up and tearing around the stage as if possessed."

In September 2020, Parella announced via a post on the band's official Instagram page that, as of early 2020, Deal Casino was no longer a band, with Cowell and Rodney going separate ways, albeit "on good terms and as friends." Parella continues to make music independently.

Parella, who performs under the name Joe P, released an EP titled "Emily Can't Sing" in 2021. The fifth track, "Off My Mind," sits at over 11 million streams on Spotify.

Personnel 

 Joe Parella — lead vocals, guitar (2013–2020)
 Jozii Cowell — guitar (2013–2020)
 Jon Rodney — bass (2013–2020)
 Christopher Donofrio  — drums (2013–2019)

Discography 
Studio albums
Deal Casino (2017)
LLC (2018)

EPs
Cocaine Love (2013)
The Runaways (2013)
Heck (2014)
Nika (2015)
Human Cannonball (2016)
Isadora Duncan (2018)
Woof (2020)

References

External links
 

2013 establishments in New Jersey
Alternative rock groups from New Jersey
American pop rock music groups
American art rock groups
Asbury Park, New Jersey
Dance-rock musical groups
Indie rock musical groups from New Jersey
Jersey Shore musical groups
Musical groups established in 2013
People from Sparta, New Jersey